Rajanna is a 2011 Indian Telugu-language period action film written and directed by V. Vijayendra Prasad. The film is produced by Nagarjuna, and starred him, Sneha and child artist Baby Annie. The film is partially inspired by Razakar movement, and freedom fighter Suddala Hanmanthu. Rajanna was released to positive reviews and critical acclaim, with soundtrack composed by M. M. Keeravani. The film recorded as Above Average at the box office. The film has won six state Nandi Awards, including the Nandi Award for Second Best Feature Film - Silver.

Plot

Nelakondapalli village of Khammam district during the time of Nizam's rule on the Princely State of Hyderabad in early 1940s is under the feudal rule of an aristocratic family headed by cruel and oppressive woman addressed as "Dorasani". Mallamma, the young kid living in the village with her grandfather Sambayya has a gifted talent of singing from which her grandfather wants her to be separated for mysterious reasons. Mallamma is attached to a basil plant which is regarded as a holy one by the suppressed village's inhabitants who discreetly buried their revolutionary leader Rajanna under the plant. Sambayya desires to have Mallamma educated and takes her to Dorasani for paying educational tax where Mallamma listens to Kulkarni, a Carnatic music teacher who teaches Dorasani's uninterested and arrogant daughter. Mallamma sings upon being encouraged by the tunes enraging Dorasani, who envies her for the talent, her daughter could not acquire. Dorasani flogs Mallamma and restrains her from singing. 

Kulkarni meets Mallamma, gifts her a radio for listening to songs and during a conversation with Sambayya, divulges that he knew of Mallamma being Rajanna's daughter which Sambayya concealed and adopted her when Mallamma's widowed mother Lachamma was murdered by the landlords. Kulkarni volunteers to hide the truth while Mallamma sings for the second time and is caught red-handed by Dorasani who is travelling by. Before Dorasani could capture Mallamma, Sambayya evades with her to a nearby railway station and they board a train but Mallamma gets off the train unwilling to leave her hometown. Sambayya reveals to Mallamma about her true parentage surprising her and further increasing her attachment towards the village. They are captured by Dorasani and her hooligans, who throw Mallamma in a burning hut and beat Sambayya to death. Kulkarni rescues Mallamma, has her cremate Sambayya and asks her to leave the village. She decides to go Delhi, meet the Prime minister of India Jawaharlal Nehru and request him to abolish Dorasani's rule in her village, having heard a previous conversation between the elders about it. Upon reaching Delhi after miles of journey, she falls unconscious and is sheltered by a kind Telugu woman Samakka and her husband who live by selling flowers. 

Mallamma is supposed to meet Nehru on the first of next month when he meets commoners to hear their problems. However, Mallamma is overthrown by the crowd and is injured in the scuffle leaving her unable to meet Nehru. She sings in a sad mood but is heard by Shyama Shastri, a friend of Nehru and great carnatic musician who offers her a chance to sing in the competition arranged on the account of Nehru's birthday on November 14 which would be attended by him. Mallamma writes to Kulkarni about the events, continuing her stay at Sammakka's residence but the letter reaches Dorasani, who abducts Mallamma by beating Samakka and her husband, black and blue and capturing Mallamma in a room with Kulkarni as Dorasani desires to kill them after the competition ends to cruelly enjoy her desperation to attend the competition. 

That night, Mallamma gets to listen about her father's story from Kulkarni. Rajanna fought against the British Raj in India and though after gaining independence, the Hyderabad state's King of Nizam refused to be merged with India leaving the citizens to be oppressed under aristocratic rule. Rajanna returned to his hometown, Nelakondapalli and learnt about the miseries faced by the natives under suppressive landlords. He radicalized them to massacre the oppressors and sliced off the hand of a Zamindar for misbehaving with a woman named Lacchamma. When the Zamindar to returned to avenge, Rajanna motivated Lacchamma to kill him herself creating a spark of revolution and bravery. The revolution spreaded and unable to suppress the revolt, the local Zamindars consulted Razakars. Rajanna married Lacchamma and they had a daughter Mallamma. Rajanna succumbed to the revolution along with his four companions of different races united by their identity of belonging to same nation. After Rajanna's death, Lacchamma was hunted down by the Zamindars but she managed to save her daughter before dying by leaving her on a boat in the river. Sambayya took over Mallamma and raised her as his own. 

At present, Mallamma escapes the shed and manages to reach the competition and though the contest ends, she receives a chance to sing her heart out and requests Nehru to free her hometown impressing him with her patriotism. Nehru drives away Dorasani and helps the town develop which later is shown to have a statue of Rajanna, garlanded by Mallamma.

Cast
 
 Nagarjuna Akkineni as Rajanna
 Sneha as Lachamma, Rajanna's wife
 Baby Annie as Mallamma, Rajanna's daughter
 Shwetha Menon as Dorasani, the cruel landlady
 Nassar as Kulkarni, music teacher
 Supreeth as Jagjit, Rajanna's aide 
 Mukesh Rishi as Landlord
 Vijayakumar as Shyama Shastri, a carnatic musician 
 Ajay as Rajanna's aide
 Pradeep Rawat as Rajanna's aide
 Ravi Kale as Dorasani's aide 
 Hema as Samakka, Mallamma's namesake sister during her stay in Delhi
 Telangana Shakuntala as a bystander whom Mallamma meets
 Ajay Ghosh as Dorasani's aide
 Saurabh Dubey as Jawaharlal Nehru
 Sravan as Rajanna's aide
 Sanjeevi 
 Gandhi 
 Dinakar Gavand
 Alapathi Lakshmi 
 Vaishali
 Aruna Devi
 Master Athulith

Soundtrack

The music was composed by M. M. Keeravani. Music was released on Vel Records Music Company. The audio was well received and was opened to positive reviews by critics.

Casting
It was announced in 2010 that Nagarjuna would do a film titled 'Rajanna' under Vijayendra Prasad's direction. S. S. Rajamouli choreographed the action sequences of the film. Sneha was hired to play the female lead after their previous hit Sri Ramadasu.

Malayalam actress Shwetha Menon played a negative role. Baby Annie was cast in the role of an orphaned girl.

Production
A massive village set and Bungalow set were erected near Jubilee Hills of Hyderabad for the film. It accidentally caught fire on 5 April 2011 causing a loss of 7 million. Filming resumed after 2 weeks.

The film was set to be released on 23 December 2011, but the date was moved ahead to 21 December due to a good response to the film's music.

Critical acclaim
The reviews from the press were very positive. Rediff hailed the film as brilliant and fullhyd.com said "Mallamma's story is brilliantly written", and praised the performances as well, particularly that of Baby Annie. StudentLive gave 4/5, saying, "Rajanna is a movie made a genuine effort. It’s not a movie stuffed with brainless action. This is something rare from the stables of Tollywood which more often than not dishes movies that require you to leave your brain behind when you watch the movie. Rajanna is sure to touch your hearts." The film was later dubbed and released in Tamil as Raja Singh during 2015.

Accolades

Notes

References

External links
 

2011 films
Films set in Hyderabad, India
Films set in Telangana
Films scored by M. M. Keeravani
2010s Telugu-language films
2010s historical action films
Indian historical action films
Films set in the 1940s
Cultural depictions of Jawaharlal Nehru
Films set in the Indian independence movement
Films set in the British Raj
Films set in Delhi
Films about children